
Gmina Lubochnia is a rural gmina (administrative district) in Tomaszów Mazowiecki County, Łódź Voivodeship, in central Poland.

The gmina contains part of the protected area called Spała Landscape Park.

Villages
Gmina Lubochnia contains the villages and settlements of Albertów, Brenica, Chrzemce, Cygan, Czółna, Dąbrowa, Dębniak, Emilianów, Glinnik, Henryków, Jasień, Kierz, Kochanów, Kruszewiec, Lubochenek, Lubochnia, Lubochnia Dworska, Lubochnia-Górki, Luboszewy, Małecz, Marianka, Nowy Glinnik, Nowy Jasień, Nowy Olszowiec, Olszowiec, Osiedle Nowy Glinnik, Rzekietka and Tarnowska Wola.

Neighbouring gminas
Gmina Lubochnia is bordered by the town of Tomaszów Mazowiecki and by the gminas of Budziszewice, Czerniewice, Inowłódz, Tomaszów Mazowiecki, Ujazd and Żelechlinek.

References
Polish official population figures 2006

Lubochnia
Tomaszów Mazowiecki County